Misterhult is a locality situated in Oskarshamn Municipality, Kalmar County, Sweden with 203 inhabitants in 2010.

References 

Populated places in Kalmar County
Populated places in Oskarshamn Municipality